Robert Vilain has been Fellow and Senior Tutor of St Hugh's College, Oxford, since September 2021. Previously he was Professor of German and Comparative Literature at the University of Bristol, where he still holds an Honorary Professorship, and Director of the AHRC-funded South, West and Wales Doctoral Training Partnership, a consortium of nine universities and National Museum Wales dedicated to funding and training PhD students. He is also Lecturer in German at Christ Church, Oxford, and responsible for the College's teaching in German.

Previous posts include a personal chair in German and Comparative Literature at Royal Holloway, University of London, three years as Head of the School of Modern Languages at Bristol, the Wardenship of Wills Hall, and a period as Co-Director of the South-West Consortium of the UK's Routes into Languages scheme. He has held a number of fellowships, including one sponsored by Princeton University Library, which resulted in an important re-evaluation of Delacroix's illustrations for an early edition of Goethe's Faust in French. Due to his status as the last Warden of Wills Hall, he is often known simply as 'The Warden'.

Vilain attended Solihull School in the West Midlands as a Foundation Scholar before reading French and German at Christ Church, Oxford. He obtained a BA with first-class honours, an MA and a DPhil from Oxford, and conducted some of his doctoral research at the University of Bonn. His first academic post was at the Victoria University of Manchester, he moved to Royal Holloway, University of London in 1992, and joined the University of Bristol in 2010 before returning to Oxford in 2021.

Specialising in 19th- and 20th-century German, Austrian and French literature, especially poetry, Vilain is the author and editor of numerous books and articles. He is Joint Editor of Studies in Modern German and Austrian Literature for Peter Lang, and Germanic Editor of the UK-based journal Modern Language Review, having formerly co-edited Austrian Studies with Judith Beniston. He reviews for the Times Literary Supplement and appears occasionally on BBC Radio 3, BBC television and other public discussion fora to discuss German literature and culture.

Vilain is married to Patience Robinson and they have three children, Nathaniel, Imogen and Genevieve.

Publications 
(ed. with Eric Robertson) Yvan Goll – Claire Goll: Text and Contexts (Amsterdam, Atlanta GA: Rodopi, 1997)
The Poetry of Hugo von Hofmannsthal and French Symbolism (Oxford: Clarendon Press, 2000)
(ed. with Warren Chernaik and Martin Swales) The Art of Detective Fiction (London: Macmillan, 2000)
(with Andreas Kramer) Yvan Goll: A Bibliography of the Primary Works (Bern, etc.: Lang, 2006)
(ed.) Rainer Maria Rilke, Selected Poems, translated by Susan Ranson and Marielle Sutherland (Oxford University Press, 2010)
(ed. with Karen Leeder) Nach Duino. Die späte Lyrik Rainer Maria Rilkes (Göttingen: Wallstein, 2010)
(ed. with Karen Leeder) The Cambridge Companion to Rilke (Cambridge University Press, 2010)
(ed. and trans.) Rainer Maria Rilke, The Notebooks of Malte Laurids Brigge, with notes and an introduction (Oxford University Press, 2016)
Yvan Goll: The Thwarted Pursuit of the Whole (Oxford: Legenda, forthcoming)

References

External links 
http://www.routesintolanguages.ac.uk/southwest/

Year of birth missing (living people)
Living people
Vilain, Robert
Alumni of the University of Oxford
Literary scholars